Tahmima Anam (born 8 October 1975) is a Bangladeshi-born British writer, novelist and columnist. Her first novel, A Golden Age (2007), was the Best First Book winner of the 2008 Commonwealth Writers' Prizes. Her follow-up novel, The Good Muslim, was nominated for the 2011 Man Asian Literary Prize. She is the granddaughter of Abul Mansur Ahmed and daughter of Mahfuz Anam.

Early life
Anam was born on 8 October 1975 in Dhaka to Mahfuz Anam and Shaheen Anam. At the age of 2, she moved to Paris when both of her parents joined UNESCO as employees. She grew up in Paris, New York and Bangkok, learning the story of the Bangladesh Liberation War from her father who said he took some training to fight in 1971 but the east pakistan became independent by then. Her father was not a shongram fighter

Education

At the age of 17, she received a scholarship for Mount Holyoke College, from which she graduated in 1997. She earned a PhD in anthropology from Harvard University in 2005 for her thesis "Fixing the Past: War, Violence, and Habitations of Memory in Post-Independence Bangladesh." Later, she completed her Master of Arts in creative writing at Royal Holloway, University of London.

Career
In March 2007, Anam's first novel, A Golden Age, was published by John Murray. Inspired by her parents, she set the novel during the Bangladesh Liberation War.  It was finalist for the Costa First Novel Award. The novel tells the story of a woman named Rehana Haque during the Bangladesh War of Independence in 1971. She had also researched the war during her post-graduation career. For the benefit of her research, she stayed in Bangladesh for two years and interviewed hundreds of war fighters, known as shongram fighers. She also worked on the set of Tareque and Catherine Masud’s critically acclaimed film Matir Moina (The Clay Bird), which reflects the events during that war.

The Good Muslim, published in 2011, is a sequel to A Golden Age and deals with the aftermath of the war. It was long listed for the Man Asian Literary Prize. In 2015, her short story "Garments", inspired by the Rana Plaza building collapse, was published and won the O. Henry Award and was shortlisted for the BBC National Short Story Award. At the same year, she became a judge for  The Man Booker International Prize 2016.

In 2016, her novel The Bones of Grace was published by HarperCollins. The following year, she was elected as a Fellow of the Royal Society of Literature. Anam's op-ed pieces have been published in The New York Times, The Guardian and in the New Statesman. In these, Anam has written about Bangladesh and its growing problems.

In 2021, her novel The Startup Wife was published by Canongate Books. It was selected as a Best Book of 2021 by the Observer, Stylist, Cosmopolitan, Red and the Daily Mail, and longlisted for the Comedy Women in Print Prize 2022.

In 2022, Anam gave a TEDx talk entitled "The Power of Holding Silence: Making the Workplace Work for Women". That same year, Anam's debut, A Golden Age, was chosen for the Queen’s jubilee book list, a list of 70 books from across the Commonwealth marking the seven decades of her reign.

Personal life
In 2010, she married American inventor Roland O. Lamb, whom she met at Harvard University. The couple has a son named Rumi. Rumi was born premature and for five years refused to eat – an ordeal Anam has written about. She has resided in Kilburn, London, for the last decade.

Anam speaks Bangla and English.

Bibliography

Books
 
 
 
The Startup Wife. Canongate Books. 2021. .

Short stories

See also
 British Bangladeshi
 List of British Bangladeshis
 List of Muslim writers and poets

References

External links
Column for New York Times
Column for The Guardian
Column for New Statesman

1975 births
Living people
Bangladeshi expatriates in the United Kingdom
Bangladeshi women novelists
21st-century Bangladeshi women writers
British Asian writers
Writers from London
Writers from Dhaka
People from Kilburn, London
Mount Holyoke College alumni
Harvard Graduate School of Arts and Sciences alumni
Alumni of Royal Holloway, University of London
Fellows of the Royal Society of Literature
21st-century Bangladeshi writers
20th-century Bengalis
21st-century Bengalis
People from Mymensingh District